Rui Jorge Farto Correia (born 23 August 1990) is a Portuguese professional footballer who plays for C.F. Estrela da Amadora as a defensive midfielder or a central defender.

Club career
Born in Chaves, Correia played youth football with Seixal FC. Until the age of 22 he competed in the lower leagues, signing with Portimonense S.C. from the Segunda Liga in the summer of 2013.

Correia joined Primeira Liga club C.D. Nacional for the 2014–15 season, after agreeing to a four-year contract. He made his debut in the tournament on 17 August 2014, playing the full 90 minutes in a 0–1 home loss against Moreirense FC.

Correia scored a career-best five goals in the 2015–16 campaign, helping the Madeirans finish in 11th position.

Personal life
Correia's father, Manuel, was also a footballer and a defender.

References

External links

Portuguese League profile 

1990 births
Living people
People from Chaves, Portugal
Sportspeople from Vila Real District
Portuguese footballers
Association football defenders
Association football midfielders
Association football utility players
Primeira Liga players
Liga Portugal 2 players
Seixal F.C. players
Amora F.C. players
G.D. Sesimbra footballers
G.D. Fabril players
Portimonense S.C. players
C.D. Nacional players
F.C. Paços de Ferreira players
C.F. Estrela da Amadora players